The Modesty Stakes is a Grade III  American Thoroughbred horse race run annually at Churchill Downs in Louisville, Kentucky.

A Grade III race contested over a distance of  miles on turf, it is open to fillies and mares aged four and older. Run in May during on Kentucky Oaks day, the event currently offers a purse of $250,000.

Inaugurated in 1942 at the old Washington Park Race Track as a race for three-year-old fillies, the following year it was made open to both fillies and older mares. Until 1951, it was run as the Modesty Stakes. It was raced on dirt from 1942 through 1955, 1958 through 1965, and again in 1996.

It has been run at various distances:
 1 mile : 1942, 1944–1946, 1952, 1966
 3/4 mile (6 furlongs) : 1947–1951, 1953–1954, 1958–1962
 7/8 mile (7 furlongs) : 1943, 1963–1965
  miles (8.5 furlongs) : 1955–1957, 1967–1968,1986
  miles (9 furlongs) : 1987
  miles (9.5 furlongs) : 1980–1985, 1989–present
 
The race was hosted by Washington Park Race Track from 1942 through 1945 and from 1968 through 1961. Hawthorne Race Course hosted it in 1985. The race was named in honor of Modesty, a filly owned by Edward Corrigan who beat her male counterparts to win the 1884 inaugural running of the American Derby at Washington Park Race Track under African-American U.S. Racing Hall of Fame jockey, Isaac Burns Murphy.

In 1966, the Modesty Handicap was run in two divisions. There was no race from 1969 through 1979 inclusive, nor in 1988, 1995, 1998 and 1999.
In 2022, the event was moved to Churchill Downs after the closure of Arlington Park in Arlington Heights, Illinois.

Records
Speed  record: (at current distance of  miles)
 1:53.80 – Fantasia (GB) (2011)

Most wins:
 2 – Sickle's Image (1951, 1954)
 2 – Indian Maid (1960, 1961)
 2 – Gaily Gaily (1989, 1990)

Most wins by an owner:
 3 – Calumet Farm (1948, 1952, 1959)

Most wins by a jockey:
 3 – René Douglas (2002, 2003, 2008)
 3 – Earlie Fires (1982, 1986, 1993)

Most wins by a trainer:
 3 – Harry Trotsek (1953, 1956, 1958)
 3 – William I. Mott (1989, 1990, 2005)

Winners

References

 The Modesty Handicap at Pedigree Query

Graded stakes races in the United States
1942 establishments in Illinois
Turf races in the United States
Middle distance horse races for fillies and mares
Arlington Park
Recurring sporting events established in 1942
Horse races in Illinois
Churchill Downs horse races
Grade 3 stakes races in the United States